Nuvvu Naaku Nachav is a 2001 Indian Telugu-language romantic comedy film directed by K. Vijaya Bhaskar who co-wrote the film with Trivikram Srinivas. It is produced by Sravanthi Ravi Kishore under the Sri Sravanthi Movies studio. The film stars Venkatesh and Aarthi Agarwal which also marks the latter's debut. The music was composed by Koti.

Released on 6 September 2001, the film was a critical and commercial success, It won five Nandi Awards, including Akkineni Award for Best Home-viewing Feature Film. It was remade in Tamil as Vaseegara (2003), in Kannada as Gowramma (2005), and in Bengali as Majnu (2013).

Plot 
Venky is an unemployed graduate from Anakapalli. He moves to Hyderabad to find a job on his father Sekharam's insistence. He arrives at his father's childhood friend, Srinivasa Moorthy's house to stay there.

Meanwhile, Moorthy's daughter Nandu is engaged to Prasad, a software professional from the USA. Venky helps the family in making arrangements and soon bonds with everyone. He also has petty fights with Nandu who start their relationship with hatred that later turns into a friendship. At the request of Sekharam, Murthy helps Venky in securing a job. Moorthy's sister Sujatha also arrives at their house. She shares a special bond with her niece Nandu and talks about the importance of marriage and finding a loving partner.

Soon, Nandu develops feelings for Venky and confesses her love to him. Venky, who does not want to spoil the relationship between their parents, leaves the house. However, Murthy goes to the railway station and talks to Venky. As Venky returns, Nandu stops talking to him. Later, Venky accompanies Nandu and Pinky (Nandu's cousin) to Nandu's friend Asha's wedding. After the wedding, they go to an amusement park where they meet a photographer (Bramhanandam). Following their trip, Venky also realizes his love for Nandu but does not express it, pretending not to have any feelings for her.

As Nandu's wedding approaches, Venky takes the onus of making arrangements for it. The demure Nandu is shattered and tells Sujatha about her love. Sujatha talks to Venky, asking him not to let Nandu suffer by rejecting her. Sekharam overhears the conversation that leaves him speechless. On the other hand, Prasad's family gets hold of a photo in which Venky and Nandu intimately hold their hands. Furious Moorthy admonishes Nandu but Sujatha backs her by telling him that falling in love is not a woman's fault.

Venky goes to Prasad's family and begs them not to call off the wedding. He vouches that Nandu is not at fault but Prasad's family couldn't care less. Moorthy arrives and asks them to leave. Moorthy tells Venky that he shouldn't have kept his love hidden. Venky, however, is ready to sacrifice his love so that Moorthy and Sekharam's friendship is not spoiled. Moorthy is moved and lets Venky marry his daughter.

On their wedding day, the photographer confesses that he handed over their photo to the house servant Banthi to deliver to the bridegroom,  believing that Nandu and Venky were getting married. Banthi, however, gave the photo to Prasad. The photographer is shocked to learn that the previous wedding was called off due to his photo and a new wedding is taking place.

Cast

Soundtrack 

Music is composed by Koti and released by Aditya Music Company. The song "Okkasari Cheppaleva" is based on the Robert Miles song "Fable".

Release 
The film was released with 113 prints in 147 centres.

Reception

Critical reception 
Idlebrain.com rated the film 4/5, and was in praise of the performances of the lead cast and the screenplay. "The strength of the film is Venky, Aarti, the comedy dialogues and sensible direction," the reviewer added. Sify which rated 3 stars out of 5, criticised the film for "lack of freshness", and "weak screenplay," and opined that the film resembles a "wedding album."

Box office 
The film has undergone theatrical business of 7.24 crore and collected a distributors' share of 18 crore in its complete theatrical run and emerged as super hit. and 2.63 crore in its opening week. It was the third highest grossing Telugu film of all time, at its release.

The film had a 50-day run in 93 centres and a 100-day run in 57 centres. It had a 175-day run in three centres.

Remakes
It was remade in Kannada as Gowramma (2005), in Tamil as Vaseegara (2003) and in Bengali as Majnu (2013).

Awards
Nandi Awards
Best Home-viewing Feature Film - Sravanthi Ravi Kishore
Best Supporting Actress - Suhasini
Best Female Dubbing Artist - Savitha Reddy
Best Dialogue Writer - Trivikram Srinivas
Best Choreographer - Suchitra

References

External links 
 

2001 films
Telugu films remade in other languages
Films set in Hyderabad, India
Films shot in Hyderabad, India
Indian romantic comedy films
2001 romantic comedy films
Films scored by Koti
Films directed by K. Vijaya Bhaskar
2000s Telugu-language films